Purolator Inc. is a Canadian courier that is 91% owned by Canada Post, 7% owned by Rainmaker Investments Ltd. and 2% by others.
The company was originally organized as Trans Canada Couriers, Ltd.  In 1967, it was acquired by the US manufacturer of oil and air filters Purolator of Fayetteville, North Carolina (founded as Motor Improvements Incorporated in 1923)—the name was originally an abbreviated form of "pure oil later".  In 1987, the company returned to Canadian ownership. Although it retained the Purolator name, it has had no connection with the oil filter business since that time.

Purolator partners with UPS for deliveries outside Canada.

Cargojet operates Boeing 757 and Boeing 767 aircraft for Purolator.

History 

Purolator began in the 1960s, initially called Trans Canadian Couriers with two employees as a subsidiary of American Courier Corporation. In 1967, ACC was bought out by Purolator Filters, who made automotive oil filtration systems (hence the name "Pure-oil-later" = "Pur-o-lator").

In 1987 Purolator partnered with DHL's predecessor (Airborne Express) to better serve the American market which continued until 2008. In 1993, Canada Post became the majority shareholder.

Corporate citizenship
In 2003, the Purolator Tackle Hunger initiative was created by company employees to address food insecurity and has since delivered over 18 million meals to food banks across Canada.  Purolator has also refurbished and donated 20 curbside delivery vehicles to Canadian food banks and food organizations as part of the Purolator Tackle Hunger initiative.  The Canadian Football League is a partner in the Purolator Tackle Hunger initiative and raises awareness through Game Day Drives.  Annually, during the first week of June, the Purolator Tackle Hunger Week is held to raise awareness of food insecurity and to collect donations.

Unicell Quicksider

On September 24, 2007, Purolator Inc. introduced the Unicell Quicksider, a prototype full-electric, lightweight urban delivery vehicle, developed by a consortium led by Toronto-based Unicell Limited in partnership with ArvinMeritor, Battery Engineering and Test Services Inc.; Bodycote Material Testing; Electrovaya Inc.; PMG Technologies Inc.; Purolator Courier Ltd.; Southwestern Energy; and the Transportation Development Centre of Transport Canada.

References

External links

Purolator Freight website
Purolator E-Ship Web Services (EWS)

Canada Post
Express mail
Logistics companies of Canada
Transport companies established in 1960
1960 establishments in Canada
Companies based in Mississauga